The 2009 Indoor Football League season is the inaugural season of the Indoor Football League, a league formed as a merger between the Intense Football League and United Indoor Football. The regular season began on Friday, March 13 and ended on Saturday, July 11.  The league champions were the Billings Outlaws, who defeated the RiverCity Rage in the 2009 United Bowl.

Standings

United Conference

Intense Conference

z=clinched top seed in conference, x=clinched division, y=clinched wild card spot

Playoffs

Awards

Individual season awards

1st Team All-IFL

2nd Team All-IFL

References